VideoScribe is an easy-to-use animation software and is best known for its iconic hand-drawn, whiteboard animation style. With VideoScribe, you can also create 2D and mixed media animations. You do not need any animation, design, or video editing skills to get started. Simply search the image library, drag and drop across the canvas and you are on your way to creating exciting custom animations. Access the library of professional-quality animated video and GIF templates for every topic, platform and occasion. Just click to customize and hit publish to share your creation. From template to finished video in under five minutes.

It was launched in 2012 by UK company Sparkol. By 2022, it is used in more than 190 countries around the world. VideoScribe is available to be used offline as a downloadable desktop app or as an online browser tool, which can be used across different devices. VideoScribe gives new users a seven-day free trial after which users can buy VideoScribe on monthly or yearly subscriptions, which gives users rights for commercial and resell use. There are multi-user discounts for businesses and education establishments.

VideoScribe creations can be exported in a variety of video formats, such as MOV, GIF and MP4. VideoScribe features, VideoScribe Instant Answers.</ref>

Notable uses 
In April 2013, American school children used VideoScribe to create a message for Barack Obama, pleading with the US president to reinstate their tour of the White House after it was cancelled by federal budget cuts.

UK Chancellor George Osborne narrated a scribe to explain the Spending Round on the British Government website in June 2013. The following month, VideoScribe was recommended on the BBC News website.

Mashable have used VideoScribe to make several whiteboard videos for their website.

See also
 Animaker
 Inshot

References

External links 
 

Animation software
Whiteboard animation
Computer animation
Marketing companies established in 2012
Presentation software
Zoomable user interfaces
Software companies of the United Kingdom